For most of its history, the ancient Greek city-state of Sparta in the Peloponnese was ruled by kings. Sparta was unusual among the Greek city-states in that it maintained its kingship past the Archaic age. It was even more unusual in that it had two kings simultaneously, who were called the archagetai, coming from two separate lines. According to tradition, the two lines, the Agiads and Eurypontids, were respectively descended from the twins Eurysthenes and Procles, the descendants of Heracles, who supposedly conquered Sparta two generations after the Trojan War. The dynasties themselves, however, were named after the twins' grandsons, the kings Agis I and Eurypon, respectively. The Agiad line was regarded as being senior to the Eurypontid line.

Although there are lists of the earlier purported Kings of Sparta, there is little evidence for the existence of any kings before the middle of the sixth century BC or so.

Spartan kings received a recurring posthumous hero cult like that of the similarly Doric kings of Cyrene. The kings' firstborn sons, as heirs-apparent, were the only Spartan boys expressly exempt from the Agoge; however, they were allowed to take part if they so wished, and this endowed them with increased prestige when they ascended the throne.

Legendary kings of Sparta
Ancient Greeks named males after their fathers, producing a patronymic with the infix -id-; for example, the sons of Atreus were the Atreids. For royal houses, the patronymic was formed from the name of the founder or of an early significant figure of a dynasty. A ruling family might thus have a number of dynastic names; for example, Agis I named the Agiads, but he was a Heraclid and so were his descendants.

If the descent was not known or was scantily known, the Greeks made a few standard assumptions based on their cultural ideology. Agiad people were treated as a tribe, presumed to have descended from an ancestor bearing its name. He must have been a king, who founded a dynasty of his name. That mythologizing extended even to place names. They were presumed to have been named after kings and divinities. Kings often became divinities, in their religion.

Lelegids
The Lelegid were the descendants of Lelex (a back-formation), ancestor of the Leleges, an ancient tribe inhabiting the Eurotas valley before the Greeks, who, according to the mythological descent, amalgamated with the Greeks

Lacedaemonids
The Lacedaemonids contain Greeks from the age of legend, now treated as being the Bronze Age in Greece. In the language of mythologic descent, the kingship passed from the Leleges to the Greeks.

Years with no dates (only "c.") are unknown

Atreids
The Atreidai (Latin Atreidae) belong to the Late Bronze Age, or the Mycenaean Period. In mythology, they were the Perseides. As the name of Atreus is attested in Hittite documents, this dynasty may well be protohistoric.

Years with no dates (only "c.") are unknown

Heraclids
The Spartan kings as Heracleidae claimed descent from Heracles, who through his mother was descended from Perseus. Disallowed the Peloponnesus, Hercules embarked on a life of wandering. The Heracleidae became ascendant in the Eurotas valley with the Dorians who, at least in legend, entered it during an invasion called the Return of the Heracleidae; driving out the Atreids and at least some of the Mycenaean population.

Years with no dates (only "c.") are unknown

Agiad dynasty 
The dynasty was named after its second king, Agis.

Eurypontid dynasty 
The dynasty is named after its third king Eurypon. Not shown is Lycurgus, the lawgiver, a younger son of the Eurypontids, who served a brief regency either for the infant Charilaus (780–750 BC) or for Labotas (870–840 BC) the Agiad.

Currently known two lists of kings:

According to Herodotus, VIII: 131

According to Pausanias, III, 7: 5-6

Sole kings

The Achaean League annexed Sparta in 192 BC.

Notes and references
Notes

References

Bibliography
 Paul Cartledge, Sparta and Lakonia, A Regional History 1300–362 BC, London, Routledge, 2002 (originally published in 1979). 
 The Cyclopædia, Volume 20. By Abraham Rees. Page 157+ (List of kings of Sparta on pg. 164).
 Sir William Smith, A New Classical Dictionary of Greek and Roman Biography, Mythology, and Geography: Partly Based Upon the Dictionary of Greek and Roman Biography and Mythology. Harper & Brothers, 1851.
 Sir William Smith. Abaeus-Dysponteus. J. Murray, 1890.
 Sir William Smith. A Dictionary of Greek and Roman Biography and Mythology: Earinus-Nyx. J. Murray, 1876.
 William Smith (Ed.) A Dictionary of Greek and Roman Biography and Mythology: Oarses-Zygia. J. Murray, 1880.

External links
 Livius
 Eurypontids and Agiads by Jona Lendering

Sparta, Kings
Sparta